Streptohalobacillus is a genus of bacteria from the family of Bacillaceae with one known species (Streptohalobacillus salinus). Streptohalobacillus salinus has been isolated from soil from the Qaidam Basin in China

References

Bacillaceae
Bacteria genera
Monotypic bacteria genera